Montville is an unincorporated community in central Montville Township, Geauga County, Ohio, United States.  It has a post office with the ZIP code 44064.  It lies at the intersection of U.S. Route 6 with State Route 528.

A post office called Montville has been in operation since 1825. The area of Montville was named for its lofty elevation.

References

Unincorporated communities in Ohio
Unincorporated communities in Geauga County, Ohio